Alopecosa solitaria is a wolf spider species in the genus Alopecosa found in Europe, Russia, and Kazakhstan.

See also 
 List of Lycosidae species

References

External links

solitaria
Spiders of Europe
Spiders of Asia
Spiders described in 1879